Freddy and the Song of the South Pacific is a 1962 West German adventure film directed by Werner Jacobs and starring Freddy Quinn, Jacqueline Sassard and Gunnar Möller.

Partial cast
 Freddy Quinn as Freddy Petersen
 Jacqueline Sassard as Mara
 Gunnar Möller as Hein
 Ralf Wolter as Hannes
 Albert Lieven as Siebzehnstern
 Elma Karlowa as Elisabeth
 Heinrich Gretler as Kapitän Brinkhoff
 Hans Deppe as Boco

External links

1962 films
1962 adventure films
1962 musical films
West German films
1960s German-language films
Films directed by Werner Jacobs
German adventure films
German musical films
Seafaring films
Films set on islands
Films set in Oceania
1960s German films